Fei is a traditional Chinese surname. It was 65th in the Hundred Family Surnames.

This surname has three main sources. Two of them are from the State of Lu during the Spring and Autumn period (722–481 BC), part of present-day Shandong province. A senior official of the state of Lu was granted a city named Fei, while the son of a certain duke was granted a county named Fei. Both of these place names were adopted by descendants as surnames. A third source of the name is Fei Zhong, a high minister of the Yin Dynasty (1401–1122 BC).

Notable people 
 Fei Hsiao-Tung, professor of sociology and anthropology
 Fei Junlong, commander of the second Chinese space flight
 Fei Wuji, corrupt minister of the State of Chu during the Spring and Autumn period
 Fei Xiang (transcription of the English name “Philips”), Taiwanese-American pop singer
 Fei Yi, regent of Shu Han during the Three Kingdoms period
 Fei Yu-ching (Stage-name), Taiwanese singer
 Fei Qinyuan, member of SNH48

Italian surname
 Alessandro Fei (disambiguation)
 Giacomo Fei (born 1992), Italian footballer

See also
 FEI (disambiguation)
 Wang Feifei (born 1987), Chinese singer, actress, presenter and model

References

Chinese-language surnames
Individual Chinese surnames